Glenview as a place name may refer to:

Australia 
 Glenview, Queensland, a locality in the Sunshine Coast Region

Republic of Ireland 
 Glenview, Tallaght

New Zealand 
 Glenview, New Zealand, a suburb of Hamilton, New Zealand

United States 
 Glenview, California (disambiguation), several places
 Glenview, Cook County, Illinois
 Naval Air Station Glenview, an operational U.S. Naval Air Station from 1923 to 1995
 Glenview, St. Clair County, Illinois
 Glenview, Kentucky
 Glenview (Stony Creek, Virginia), a historic house
 Glenview Historic District (Memphis, Tennessee), listed on the National Register of Historic Places (NRHP) in Tennessee
 John Bond Trevor House in Yonkers, New York, listed on the NRHP and sometimes known as Glenview

See also
Glenview Historic District (disambiguation)